Barnet Kellman (born November 9, 1947) is an American television and film director, television producer and film actor.

Biography
Barnet Kellman (born November 9, 1947) is an American theatre, television and film director, television producer and film actor, and educator, best known for the premiere productions of new American plays, and for the pilots of long-running television series such as Murphy Brown and Mad About You. He is the recipient of two Emmy Awards and a Directors Guild of America Award for Outstanding Achievement in Comedy.  He is the co-founder and director of USC Comedy at the School of Cinematic Arts, and holds the school's Robin Williams Endowed Chair in Comedy.

Early life and education 
Kellman was born in New York City,  and raised in suburban Long Island. His father, was Joseph A. G. Kellman, an attorney, and his mother was Verona Kellman (née Kramer).

He attended the Colgate University, Phi Beta Kappa and graduated cum laude in 1969. He attended Yale School of Drama, eventually earning his Ph.D from Union Institute at Antioch on a Danforth Graduate Fellowship. As a Thomas J. Watson Fellow, he studied theater and film in Europe and worked with renowned theater pioneer Joan Littlewood at her Theater Royal in Stratford, East London, appearing in her production of The Marie Lloyd Story.

Theatre 
Kellman began as an actor, joining Actors’ Equity at age nineteen. While still at Colgate, was an assistant to director Alan Schneider on the Broadway production of Edward Albee's A Delicate Balance. In the 1970s, he was a mainstay on New York City's Off-Broadway. He directed productions in the early seasons of Playwrights Horizons, and the Manhattan Theatre Club.

His WPA Theatre production of Key Exchange introduced playwright Kevin Wade and moved to the Orpheum Theatre for a year long run, while his acclaimed Circle Rep production of Danny and the Deep Blue Sea introduced playwright John Patrick Shanley and actor John Turturro. For Joseph Papp's New York Shakespeare Festival, he directed the works of David Rabe and William Hauptman. He was an Associate Director of the Williamstown Theatre Festival and, for ten years a regular director at the Eugene O’Neill Theatre Center's National Playwrights Conference associated with works by Shanley, Lee Blessing and Richard Dresser. His Hudson Guild production of Lee Kalcheim's Breakfast with Les and Bess had a long run at the Lambs Theatre. Other notable premieres include plays by Israel Horovitz and Donald Margulies. He is a past board member of the Society of Directors and Choreographers.

Television and Film 
Kellman got his start in the early 1980s as a director for soap operas such as the NBC-TV daytime soap opera series Another World and CBS's As the World Turns.

He directed the Showtime adaptation of the long-running Broadway play, Gemini, and the CBS special Orphans, Waifs and Wards. He made his feature film directorial debut with the 20th Century Fox screen adaptation of Key Exchange, which starred Brooke Adams.

An opportunity to direct the pilot episodes of half-hour TV comedies brought Kellman to Los Angeles. In his first pilot season he mounted pilots starring George Segal, Oprah Winfrey, Patty Lupone and Kenneth McMillan. His second pilot season brought success when his pilots of The Robert Guillaume Show and Murphy Brown were picked up as series. In 1999, Kellman directed the Murphy Brown finale episode, “Never Can Say Goodbye”. He won Emmy Awards in 1990 and 1992 for his work.

Kellman directed fifty pilots, half of which went to series, launching long runs such as NBC's Mad About You, Suddenly Susan, and George Lopez.   He also worked on CBS's Designing Women, Felicity, 
E.R., Ally McBeal, My Boys and 8 Simple Rules.

Kellman made his feature film directorial debut with the 20th Century Fox screen adaptation of Key Exchange which starred Brooke Adams. He went on to direct  Disney's 1992's Straight Talk starring Dolly Parton as a sultry, wise-cracking DJ., and the Tri-Star release Slappy and the Stinkers for Sony Pictures in 1998. In 2000, he directed the ABC television movie Mary and Rhoda, reuniting Mary Tyler Moore and Valerie Harper.

When Murphy Brown returned to the CBS schedule for an eleventh season in 2018, Kellman returned to direct the season finale.

Teaching career
In 2008, during a Writers Guild strike, Kellman joined the film faculties of the American Film Institute and the University of Southern California (USC). In 2011, he was awarded tenure at USC and co-founded the school's groundbreaking comedy program, USC Comedy at the School of Cinematic Arts. In 2017, USC named him inaugural holder of its Robin Williams Endowed Chair in Comedy.

Awards and nominations 
Emmy Award: Outstanding Direction of a Comedy Series, Murphy Brown 1992

Emmy Award:  Best Comedy, Murphy Brown  - Producer 1990

Directors Guild Award: Outstanding Direction of a Comedy, Murphy Brown Pilot 1989

Monitor Award: Best Director, Pepsi – To The Victors, starring Martin Sheen 1985

Emmy Nomination: Outstanding Direction of a Comedy Series, Murphy Brown, 1991

Emmy Nomination: Outstanding Direction of a Comedy Series, Murphy Brown 1990

Directors Guild Nomination: Outstanding Direction of a Comedy Series, Murphy Brown, 1990

Emmy Nomination: Best Comedy Murphy Brown  - Producer 1990

Emmy Nomination: Outstanding Direction of a Comedy Series, Murphy Brown 1989

Viewers For Quality Television Award 1989

Media Access Award 1989

Directors Guild Nomination: Outstanding Direction of a Comedy Series, Murphy Brown 1988

Emmy Nomination: Outstanding Direction of a Comedy Series, Murphy Brown 1988

Daytime Emmy Nomination:  Best Direction, Another World 1981

Selected filmography

Director
 Samantha Who?
 Notes from the Underbelly
 Four Kings
 Living with Fran
 George Lopez
 Alias
 Mary and Rhoda
 Felicity
 Good Advice
 Murphy Brown
 ER
 Bless This House
 Slappy and the Stinkers
 Mad About You
 Straight Talk
 Designing Women
 Another World
 True Jackson, VP

References

External links
 

American male film actors
American television directors
Television producers from New York City
1947 births
Living people
Film directors from New York City
Directors Guild of America Award winners
Primetime Emmy Award winners
Yale School of Drama alumni
Colgate University alumni
Union Institute & University alumni